Justified: City Primeval is an upcoming American Western crime drama television miniseries developed by showrunners Dave Andron and Michael Dinner.  The series continues the story from Justified taking inspiration from the Elmore Leonard novel City Primeval: High Noon in Detroit.  Timothy Olyphant returns to star as Deputy U.S. Marshal Raylan Givens. Dinner will also direct.  The series will air on FX, premiering in mid-2023.

Premise 
Raylan Givens left Kentucky for Miami, where he continues working as a U.S. Marshal while helping raise his daughter. He soon finds himself in Detroit, pursuing The Oklahoma Wildman, Clement Mansell, who has been eluding the Detroit police force.

Cast 
 Timothy Olyphant as Deputy U.S. Marshal Raylan Givens
 Aunjanue Ellis as Carolyn Wilder
 Boyd Holbrook as Clement Mansel, aka The Oklahoma Wildman
 Adelaide Clemens as Sandy
 Vondie Curtis Hall as Sweety
 Marin Ireland as Maureen
 Norbert Leo Butz as Norbert
 Victor Williams as Wendell
 Vivian Olyphant as Willa Givens, Raylan's daughter
 Ravi Patel as Rick Newley

Episodes

Production 
The production team behind Justified announced that it was working together to develop a new series based on City Primeval by Elmore Leonard in March 2021. At the time, it was rumored to possibly be a Justified spin-off series. FX confirmed the Justified revival speculation in January 2022 by announcing that a new Justified miniseries was in development, taking inspiration from City Primeval.  Dave Andron and Michael Dinner were set as the showrunners, and Dinner would direct as well.  City Primeval follows a different character, so the story is being adjusted to use Raylan Givens as the protagonist instead. In February 2022, reports surfaced that Quentin Tarantino was in talks to possibly direct an episode or two as well since he is a fan of Leonard's work, having taken inspiration from Leonard in Tarantino's own works. In April 2022, Tarantino was confirmed to not be directing the series.

Timothy Olyphant agreed to reprise the role of Deputy U.S. Marshal Raylan Givens.  In May 2022, just before the start of production in Chicago, casting announcements added several starring actors to the cast, including Aunjanue Ellis, Boyd Holbrook, Adelaide Clemens, Vondie Curtis Hall, Marin Ireland, Victor Williams, Norbert Leo Butz, and Timothy Olyphant's daughter, Vivian Olyphant. Ravi Patel was also added as a recurring cast member shortly afterward.

The production was temporarily halted while filming in Chicago when four cars broke through set barricades while engaged in a gunfight. Sony Pictures Television increased security to the production, but three weeks later, filming was interrupted again when an incendiary device was thrown towards the set.  The device did not explode, and no one was injured.

References

External links 
 

Justified (TV series)
2020s American crime drama television series
American television spin-offs
English-language television shows
FX Networks original programming
Neo-Western television series
Television shows based on American novels
Television series by Sony Pictures Television
Television shows filmed in Michigan
Television shows set in Detroit
Television shows set in Miami
United States Marshals Service in fiction
Upcoming drama television series